{"type": "Feature", "properties": { "marker-symbol": "museum", "marker-color": "3339ff", "marker-size": "medium"}, "geometry": { "type": "Point", "coordinates": [-74.78795, 41.25231] }}

Luna Parc is the semi-private museum, atelier, and private home of 21st century American multimedia artist Richard "Ricky" Boscarino located in Sandyston Township, New Jersey, United States. Twice a year, the museum and atelier are opened to the public for a three-weekday Open House.

Description
Luna Parc comprises multiple buildings and outdoor art pieces set in an 8.5-acre densely-wooded landscape. These structures are built from metal, clay, glass, wood, rock, ceramic, cement, and ferro-cement. They are designed in a whimsical architectural style, featuring vivid colors, curving surfaces, detailed mosaic tiling, and incorporating unusual objects such as bowling balls and license plates.

The fantastical outdoor appearance of Luna Parc resembles Gaudí's Park Güell in Barcelona, Spain, and the Hundertwasser House in Vienna, Austria, because Boscarino drew inspiration from both these European sites.

The main building is a 5,000 square foot residential house. The interior of this house is a cabinet of curiosities exhibiting thousands of artifacts ranging from the exotic (e.g., Tibetan yak leather pouch) to the absurd (human fallopian tubes floating in a glass vessel). Also on display inside are Boscarino's individual works of art such as his oil paintings and articulated metallic insect jewelry.

Related organization
Boscarino is also an officer in The Luna Parc Atelier Foundation Inc. The Foundation is a not-for-profit entity registered under US IRC as a 501(c)(3) organization that serves as an art colony and is chartered to teach and provide hands-on training to aspiring artists and apprentice workers. One mission of the Foundation is to ensure the continued existence of Luna Parc as a creative museum. Much of the Foundation's training, events, and fundraising takes place on the grounds of Luna Parc.

Critical reception
Mark Sceurman, co-creator and publisher of History Channel's reality television series Weird U.S., described Luna Parc in 2014 as "Of all the places we've seen, I think this is the strangest".

Some works exhibited

References

External links

 
   Autobiographical video narrated by Boscarino
   Aerial drone footage of Luna Parc in winter
  New Jersey State Council on the Arts video tour Luna Parc and interview of Boscarino

Art museums and galleries in New Jersey
Historic house museums in New Jersey
Sculpture gardens, trails and parks in the United States
Contemporary art galleries in the United States
Natural history museums in New Jersey
Art galleries established in 1989
Museums in Sussex County, New Jersey
Houses in Sussex County, New Jersey
Visionary environments
1989 establishments in New Jersey
Open-air museums in New Jersey
Museums established in 1989
Expressionist architecture
Modernisme architecture
Organic architecture
Sandyston Township, New Jersey
Tourist attractions in Sussex County, New Jersey